The Bob Devaney Sports Center (commonly referred to as the Devaney Center, formerly the NU Sports Complex) is a sports complex on the campus of the University of Nebraska-Lincoln in Lincoln, Nebraska. The 7,909-seat arena opened in 1976 and serves as the primary home venue for several of Nebraska's athletic programs. The complex is named for Bob Devaney, who served as Nebraska's football coach from 1962 to 1972 and athletic director from 1967 to 1992.

History

The Devaney Center opened in 1976 with a capacity of 13,595, replacing the Nebraska Coliseum as the primary home venue for Nebraska's men's and women's basketball programs. Initially called the NU Sports Complex, it was later named for College Football Hall of Fame head coach Bob Devaney, who led Nebraska's football program to two national championships and served as athletic director for twenty-five years. Nebraska's men's team played at the Devaney Center from 1976 until 2013, compiling a record of 477–148 in its thirty-seven years at the arena. The highest attendance recorded at the arena was 15,038, a 62–54 Nebraska win over Oklahoma State on February 7, 1981.

From December 1986 to January 1989, Nebraska's women's team won twenty-nine consecutive games at the Devaney Center, an arena record. Decades later, NU's record-setting 32–2 season in 2009–10 produced the only regular-season sellout in program history, a 67–51 win for No. 3 Nebraska over Missouri. While Pinnacle Bank Arena became the home venue for NU's men's and women's basketball teams in 2013, both programs practice and train at the Hendricks Training Complex at the Devaney Center.

The arena hosted first- and second-round games in the 1980, 1984, and 1988 men's NCAA basketball tournaments, and first-round games in the 1993 women's tournament. Michael Jordan and Magic Johnson both played preseason NBA games at the arena; during a 1995 game featuring Jordan's Bulls against former NU star Eric Piatkowski and the Los Angeles Clippers, Chicago center Dennis Rodman was called for two technical fouls and ejected to a standing ovation from the Devaney Center crowd.

The complex is home to the Devaney Center Natatorium, a 25-yard pool with a listed seating capacity of 1,000. NU hosted several Big 12 tournaments in the conference's early years. More recently, the Natatorium has been criticized as out-of-date and is considered among the worst swimming venues in the Big Ten.

In 2000, the university completed construction on the $2.979 million Devaney Center Indoor Track, which houses a 200-meter hydraulic bank track that is the largest of its kind in the world. The track seats up to 5,000 spectators and underwent a $1.1 million renovation prior to the 2011 season. The Devaney Center has hosted championship meets for each of the Big Eight, Big 12, and Big Ten.

Renovation and expansion

When the city of Lincoln completed construction of Pinnacle Bank Arena in 2013, Nebraska's basketball programs moved to the new arena, and the Devaney Center underwent a $20 million remodel to reconfigure its main arena. The remodel included the addition of luxury suites and decreasing the main arena's seating capacity to 7,907, though this number is often exceeded during volleyball games due to standing room availability. Nebraska's volleyball program has led the country in attendance in each of its eight years at the Devaney Center, averaging over 8,000 fans per game each season. NU's streak of 285 consecutive sold-out matches, second only to Nebraska football's 382 in collegiate sports, dates back to its playing days at the NU Coliseum and continued at the Devaney Center. The move to the Devaney Center has made Nebraska's volleyball program profitable, a rarity in women's collegiate athletics; the program receives no financial support from tax dollars, tuition, or student fees.

High School basketball

The Devaney Center served as the primary host venue of the NSAA Boys and Girls State Basketball Tournament every year from its opening until 2013, when it was moved to Pinnacle Bank Arena. The Devaney Center continued to host some tournament games until 2020, when all University of Nebraska on-campus facilities were closed due to the COVID-19 pandemic. Local high schools were used for games not able to be played at Pinnacle Bank Arena. State tournament games returned to the Devaney Center the following year.

Concerts

Following its opening in 1976, the Devaney Center was the main concert destination in Lincoln for several years. Notable among those who performed at the arena were Crosby, Stills & Nash (Oct. 28, 1977), Jethro Tull (Apr. 21, 1979), Elton John (Oct. 5, 1980), Journey (Apr. 6, 1983), Styx (May 20, 1983), Billy Joel (Apr. 9, 1984), Frank Sinatra (Apr. 19, 1984), Bruce Springsteen (Nov. 18, 1984), Hall and Oates (Apr. 17, 1985), Boston (Oct. 25, 1987), Def Leppard (Oct. 19, 1988), Van Halen (Nov. 5, 1988), Bob Dylan (Aug. 31, 1990), The Dixie Chicks (Oct. 8, 2000), Tim McGraw (Jun. 7, 2002), and The Beach Boys (three occasions).

Notes

References

Indoor arenas in Nebraska
Defunct college basketball venues in the United States
Basketball venues in Nebraska
Sports in Lincoln, Nebraska
Sports venues in Nebraska
Buildings and structures in Lincoln, Nebraska
Nebraska Cornhuskers basketball venues
Tourist attractions in Lincoln, Nebraska